Mootz Candies is a historic candy maker in Pottsville, Pennsylvania. Their products include a coal candy known as Black Diamonds.

References

External links
Mootz Candies Pottsville,Pa. Final Day July 20,2010 Part 1 YouTube video
Mootz Candies Pottsville,Pa. Final Day July 20,2010 Part 2 YouTube video

Confectioners